Araeococcus flagellifolius is a plant species in the genus Araeococcus. This species is native to northern South America (Colombia, Venezuela, the Guianas, northern Brazil).

References

flagellifolius
Flora of South America
Plants described in 1929